FWHS may refer to:
 Fairfield Warde High School, Fairfield, Connecticut, United States
 Federal Way High School, Federal Way, Washington, United States
 Flowing Wells High School, Tucson, Arizona, United States